The 1942–43 Challenge Cup was the 42nd staging of rugby league's oldest knockout competition, the Challenge Cup.  All four rounds, including the final, were played as two-legged ties.  The tournament took place over consecutive weeks in March and April 1943.  All the ties were drawn at the beginning of March 1943 to enable the clubs to make travel arrangements in advance.

First round

Aggregate scores shown in brackets

Second round

Aggregate scores shown in brackets

Semi-finals

Aggregate scores shown in brackets

Final
The final was played over the Easter weekend of 1943 with the first leg played on the Saturday and the second leg the following Monday. 10,740 attended the first leg at Crown Flatt while 16,000 watched the second leg at Headingley two days later. Receipts for the two games totalled £2,340.

Dewsbury won 16–15 on aggregate.

References

Challenge Cup
Challenge Cup